Elyasi (also Romanized as Elyāsī) is a village in Zalu Ab Rural District, in the Central District of Ravansar County, Kermanshah Province, Iran. At the 2006 census, its population was 60, in 13 families.

References 

Populated places in Ravansar County